Prymnesiophyceae is a haptophyte class. Although it was originally described by Casper in 1972, it did not receive a Latin diagnosis (a requirement for valid publication under the International Code of Botanical Nomenclature) until Hibberd provided one in 1976.

References

Haptophyte classes
Bikont classes